Arburua is a Navarre surname of Etxalar, Pamplona, Spain.

According to data from the Spanish National Statistical Institute (INE), as of 2017 Arburua occupies position #18425 in the list of Spanish surnames; a total of 158 people had the name as their initial last name, and 194 their second. In Navarre, 86 residents have Arburua as a first surname, and 111 as a second.

Religious monument
The Basilica of Our Lady of Arburua, located in Izal and known for its long nave, was built at the end of the 16th century and the beginning of the 17th.

Famous people named Arburua
 Eusebio Arburua Altamira, veterinarian
 Teodoro Arburua Irisarri (1876–1942), priest
 Pedro Arburua Sola (born 1880), entrepreneur; innkeeper in Morelos, Mexico
 Manuel Arburúa de la Miyar (1902–1981), Minister of Commerce (1951–1957)
 Juan Larramendi Arburua (1917–2005), painter
 Jose Beobide Arburua (born 1937), priest
 Jose Manuel Arburua Aspiunza, businessman
 Kepa Arburua Olaizola, engineer; author
 Juan Llado Arburua (born 1961), businessman
 Maria Rosa Arburua Goyeneche, author
 Marcelino Oreja Arburúa (born 1969), politician; businessman
 Manuel Felipe Oreja Arburua, businessman

References

Surnames of Spanish origin